Hiran Mitra (born 1945) is an artist based in Kolkata (West Bengal, India). He left his ancestral country home in Kharagpur to study Fine Art in the Government College of Art & Craft, Kolkata at the age of 14. His paintings are energetic abstract gestural paintings with the choreography of the human body observed from folk dance having influenced his recent calligraphic forms . He has contributed significantly to the visual stimulus in eastern Indian films, television, theatre and literature since in the 1980s [. He is also known to have defined a benchmark for book cover design for contemporary Bengali literature. His paintings are statements on the human condition and the twilight zones of reality and time. Bold brush strokes, layered washes and sprays and unconventional use of acrylic and industrial paints characterize his paintings. He is part of the Open Window Artist group and has been part of the Painters 80 Artist group in Kolkata.

Works

Selected exhibitions

Solo exhibitions
2007Written Image–Paintings & Installation–Oct 2007. Gallery Yapanchitra, India
Form and Color–Paintings of Hiran Mitra–Gallery Thuillier, Paris, Oct 2007
Paper Landscapes, Works on paper, at Gallery 27, London, Mar 2007
Book Launch: Shadows–monography (Ed. FDW France, Gerard Xuriguera)
2006Inner Sensation, recent paintings by Hiran Mitra, Gallery 27, London
2003 Works of Movement in Dance, Theatre, Rabindra Sadan, Kolkata
2002 "Journey with Rang Number", Academy of Fine Arts Kolkata, Performance, Installation.
2000  Right line Gallery, Bangalore
1997  Gaganendra Chitrashala, Calcutta
1995  Graphics on film, Nandan Film & Cultural centre, Calcutta
1995  Retrospective of two decades 70s–80s, Birla Academy of Art and Culture, Calcutta
1991 Paintings inspired by Voices of Baul Music, Calcutta School of Music
1980 Paintings, Academy of Fine Arts, Calcutta
1969 Paintings & Drawings, Birla Academy of Arts & Culture, Calcutta
1966 Paintings & Drawings, Academy of Fine Arts, Calcutta

Group shows (selection) and international art bi-annuals
2008Art Full of Bag—An installation concerning the Indian Art Market, Indian Society of Contemporary Artists at Birla Academy, *June 2008Fusion III, Art Mosaic Gallery, August 2008
2007 Biennale dell Arte Contemporane di Firenze, Florence Italy Open Window group–Art Context gallery, Singapore
2006 Who Do you think I am ? Gallery in Cork Street, LondonGallery La Mere, Annual group Show, Kolkata
2005 "Color Palette" Habitat Centre, New Delhi Special artists show, CIMA Kolkata Visual Art Gallery–New Delhi
2004 "Contemporary Forms", Cima Gallery, KolkataIndian Contemporary Art–Eleven Artists, Hart Gallery, Beijing
2003 Birla Acandemy of Art & Culture Art of Bengal, CIMA Gallery, Mumbai
2001 "Collections d’Hiver", Galerie Jacob, Paris
2000 "Art & Bread, Kunst au Indien", Curated by Hannalore Christ, Hamburg "Contemporary Indian Artists", Birla Academy of Fine Arts, Bangalore  Painters 80, Academy of Fine Arts, Calcutta  "Art for Heart", Indian National Museum, Calcutta Artists of the Millennium, Townhall Museum, Calcutta
1999 The Contemporary Indian Art Show, Birla Academy, New Delhi & Mumbai Abstract Trends International, curated Dr Archana Roy,– Birla Academy, Calcutta
Painters 80, Jehangir Art Gallery Mumbai
1998 "All India Show", Birla Academy New Delhi, Bombay, Bangalore, CalcuttaBengal Artists, Birla Academy of Arts & culture, Calcutta
1997 Eisenstein in the eyes on Artists, graphic sketches, Gorky Sadan, Calcutta
1996 "All India Show"—Guest Artist, Birla Academy New Delhi, Bombay, Bangalore.
1969  Emerging Artists of Bengal, French Cultural Centre, Calcutta

Public collections
Indian National Museum, Nimai Chatterji collection in Tate Modern,
Museum of Contemporary Art Dunkerque.

Publications and media / editions
"Shadows"–Monograph of three decades of works on paper, foreword Gerard Xuriguera, Edition FDW France
Painter of the Month: Guest, BBC World Service, hosted by Aminul Haque May 1997.
"International Art ?", by Arun Ghosh, (art critic) Calcutta Metropolitan Festival of Art, Edition1997.
"Film & Art", by Pralay Sur (Film critic) Nandan Film Institute.
"Modern Art in traditional Rural Painting of Bengal"
"Poetry in Paintings: Four Eminent Poets of Bengal", Volume 1 & 2, Illustrated with paintings of Hiran Mitra.
"Art & Society", by Hiran Mitra, Abaad publications, 1996.
1980–99 Essays on Art, Film & Social Behaviour in major daily newspapers.

Art projects (selection)
Art Full of Bag, Installation/Workshop, Birla Academy of Fine Arts, Kolkata 2008
Scene design with 10m x 6m Canvas, for the Modern drama Tista paarer brithantho
Journey with Rang Number, 2002, http://www.Suman Mukhopadhyay.com/html/rangnumber.asp
Visual Vibrations, live painting with contemporary music performance
The Chau Dancers of Purulia: study on movement and body language from Dance theatre to Painting
Various Workshops exploring Visual Arts relationship to Body Language–Naya Theatre, with Habib Tanvir Dance Company
Padatik Troupe, Chetna Jalan Show, Nabonittya, Chetana Theatre Group
Art Workshop with various Indian artists–Lalit Kala Academy, Manipur

Film and theatre art direction

Film
Necklace (released 2011), Shekhar Das
Mohanagar@Kolkata (Released 2010): Suman Mukhophadyay
Chaturanga (Released: 2008)Suman Mukhophadyay http://www.chaturangathefilm.in/html/crew.asp
Herbert (released 2005): Suman Mukhophadyay 
Moholboner Sereng (released 2005):
Shomoy (released 1986): Goutom Chatterjee
Nagbotee (released 1981): Goutom Chatterjee
Letter to Mom (released 1988): Gutom Chaterjee
Protee Bimbo (released 1971): Shoron Dey

Theatre
Shunno Thekey (premiered 2011): Suman Mukhopadhyay
Shesher Kobita (premiered 2011): Suman Mukhopadhyay
Debi Shorpo-mastha (premiered 2011): Debesh Chattyapadhay
Tota Kahini (released 2011): Abhishek Basu
Chena Sukh Chena Dukhho (premiered 2011): Debesh Chattyapadhay
Bikeley Bhorey Shorshey Phool (Premiered 2011): Debesh Chattyapadhay
Dream Dream (Premiered 2010): Debesh Chattyapadhay
King Lear (Premiered 2010): Suman Mukhopadhyay
Maan Bhonjon (Premieredd 2010): Shohon Natya goshtee
Dhorai Chorith Manosh (premiered 2010): Abhishek Basu
Dibaratreer Kabyo (Premiered 2009): Arun Mukherjee
Nirnoy (Premiered 2008): Arun Mukherjee
Meyeti (premiered 2008): by Kishore Sengupta, Featuring Goutam Halder & Bindhya Ghosh,
Kalanthok Lal Phithey (premiered 2005): Suman Mukhpadhyay
Phalguni (Premiered 2004): Suman Mukhapadhyay
Baborer Prarthona (premiered 2007): Kishore Sengupta
Hariey Jaey Manoosh (premiered 2005): Kishore Sengupta
Shomoy Ashomoyer Brittyanta (Premiered 2002): Suman Mukhapadhyay
Tista Barer Brittyanta (Premiered 2000): Suman Mukhapadhyay 
Anamni Angana (Premiered 1976): Neela Sen/Konica Sarkar
Shajahan (Premiered 1964): Jochchon Dastidar

Album cover designs
 Aabaar Bochhor Kuri Pore (1995)
 Jhora Somoyer Gaan (1996)

Awards
Residency, Lalit Kala Academy, New Delhi, Government of India
1969, 70, 71 Gold Medal, Academy of Fine Arts, All India Emerging Artist

References

External links
More information and images on www.SaatchiGallery.com
More Images on Kolkata Gallery
More images on Saffronart.com
Further images and artist biography from www.artborderline.com
 Article in India Today, Sarbani Sen 

Artists from Kolkata
Indian calligraphers
1945 births
Living people
Government College of Art & Craft alumni
University of Calcutta alumni
Indian male artists